Fundación Azteca is a Mexican non-profit organization that promotes social responsibility founded in 1997 and owned by Grupo Salinas.

It attempts to match social needs with organizations or individual willing to commit to satisfy them. Its chief executive officer (CEO) is Esteban Moctezuma, former cabinet member during the presidency of Ernesto Zedillo.

Fundación Azteca has organized education, health, environment and sports programs. I has also collaborated with other organizations, private companies and individuals as a medium of awareness of their projects.

This organization is registered with manosalaobra.org, a registry of more than 450 non-profit social organizations. Fundación Azteca has awarded 12,900 scholarships for low-income secondary and high school students through its educational project Plantel Azteca.

Programs

Juguetón
More than 13 million toys have also be given to children through the annual Juguetón ("Toy marathon").

A Quien Corresponda
The TV Azteca show A Quien Corresponda ("To Whom It May concern") its part of the effort by Fundación Azteca of assistance to the community.

Rompiendo el Silencio
The campaign Rompiendo el Silencio ("Breaking the silence") has assisted more than 300 children by providing them with hearing aids and costly cochlear implants throughout the country.

Awards
 Vienna Civil Society Award by the United Nations for its efforts in the prevention of drug use with the campaign Vive Sin Drogas.

External links
Official site 
Vienna Civil Society Award by the United Nations, presented by Kofi Annan
Official site of manosalaobra.org

Grupo Salinas
Foundations based in Mexico
Organizations established in 1997